Bodenwerder-Polle is a Samtgemeinde ("collective municipality") in the district of Holzminden, in Lower Saxony, Germany. Its seat is in the town Bodenwerder. It was formed on 1 January 2010 by the merger of the former Samtgemeinden Bodenwerder and Polle.

The Samtgemeinde Bodenwerder-Polle consists of the following municipalities:

 Bodenwerder
 Brevörde 
 Halle 
 Hehlen 
 Heinsen 
 Heyen
 Kirchbrak
 Ottenstein
 Pegestorf
 Polle
 Vahlbruch

Samtgemeinden in Lower Saxony